Mike McClellan is an Australian singer-songwriter.

Biography
McClellan began performing in the late 1960s and in 1972, released his debut album, titled simply Mike McClellan in 1972. McClellan toured extensively for the next 2 years playing the songs and previewing the material that would make up his next album.

In September 1974, McClellan's second album, Ask Any Dancer was released. The album peaked at number 22 on the Australian charts, and 
the album's lead single "Song and Danceman" was voted Song of the Year at the Annual Music Industry Awards in February 1975. In March 1976 McClellan released his third studio album, Until the Song is Done. The album peaked at number 61 on the Australian charts. McClellan recorded a live album, which was released in October 1977.

In 1979, McClellan compered his first television series, National Star Quest, which lead him to taking over the successful ABC program Country Road. Within a year, it was renamed and became Mike McClellan's Country Music and he continued to present the show for a further 3 years. In 1980, McClellan parted company with EMI and released Laughing in the Dark on the Albert's label. The album peaked at number 43 on the Australian charts and the single "The One I Love" peaked at number 45.

In 1982, McClellan travelled to the United Kingdom and United States. Upon his return in 1983, McClellan began writing for Mojo, then regarded a dynamic Australian ad agency, and he contributed words and music for clients such as Australian Airlines, Red Rooster, Channel 9, XXXX and Tooheys. McClellan left Mojo and, with a partner, set up his own agency called Kazoo. Kazoo grew rapidly and in 1991, was employing 30 staff. McClellan subsequently sold his share-holding in Kazoo and established Mike McClellan Pty Ltd.

In 1989, McClellan released his fifth studio album, The Heartland on the EMI label.

In 2001 a comprehensive retrospective of his recording career was released by EMI.

In 2011, McClellan released his first album of new songs in 20 years, titled If Only for a Moment, which was followed in 2014 by  Dancing in the Rain and in July 2017, No Intermission.

Discography

Studio albums

Live albums

Compilation albums

Singles

Other singles

References

20th-century Australian male singers
1945 births
Living people